The Marriage Industry (La Industria del matrimonio) is a 1965 Argentine film directed by Fernando Ayala, Luis Saslavsky and Enrique Carreras.

Cast

External links
 

1965 films
1960s Spanish-language films
Argentine black-and-white films
Argentine comedy films
Films directed by Fernando Ayala
Films directed by Enrique Carreras
1960s Argentine films